Events from the year 1505 in India.

Events
 Viranarasimha Raya succeeds Narasimha Raya II as king of Vijayanagara Empire (reigns until 1509)
 Tristão da Cunha ceases his nominal (never took office) governorship of Portuguese India (commenced 1504)
 Francisco de Almeida becomes governor of Portuguese India (and continues until 1509)
 7 April, Francis Xavier, Roman Catholic missionary in India (dies 1552)

Deaths
 Narasimha Raya II,  king of Vijayanagara Empire

See also
 Timeline of Indian history

References